Ocata may refer to:

Ocata Therapeutics, a stem cell therapy research center
One clock alternating timed automation, a type of automata